Iran is the official daily newspaper of the government of Iran.

Profile
Iran was launched in 1995. The Islamic Republic News Agency (IRNA) owns and publishes Iran. Iran's affiliated website is Iran Network. IRNA also publishes Iran Daily, an English-language daily newspaper, Alvefagh, an Arabic newspaper, Irane varzeshi, a sport daily newspaper, and Irane Sepid for blind people. The newspaper supports the policies of the government and is described as a pro-government conservative daily.

The daily was managed by Mosayeb Naeemi during the presidency of Mahmoud Ahmadinejad. Following the 2013 presidential election Mohammad Taqi Roghaniha, CEO of Iran Cultural and Press Institute (ICPI), was appointed manager of the daily.

Bans
Iran was closed down by the Press Supervisory Board in May 2006 following its publication a caricature which was deemed to be "divisive and provocative". The caricature which mocked Azeris caused stir among Azeri people living in the country. In response both the artist who had drawn the caricature and the editor-in-chief were arrested. The paper was banned again for six months by an Iranian court due to its alleged false report in June 2013.

See also
List of newspapers in Iran
Media of Iran

References

1995 establishments in Iran
Publications established in 1995
Persian-language newspapers
Newspapers published in Iran
Government of Iran
State media